Carlos Watson may refer to:

 Carlos Watson (footballer) (born 1951), former Costa Rican footballer
 Carlos Watson (journalist) (born 1969), American journalist, businessman, and television host